Tohuwabohu (Hebrew "formless and void"), is a phrase found at the beginning of Genesis in the Hebrew Bible

Tohuwabohu, or spelling variants, can refer to:
 Tohuwabohu, 1920 German novel by Sammy Gronemann
 Tohuwabohu (TV series), Austrian cabaret TV series 1990 - 1998
 Tohuvabohu (album): album by band KMFDM